Massage is a 2008 Chinese novel by Bi Feiyu about blind masseurs. It won China's most prestigious Mao Dun Literature Prize in 2011. The novel has been translated into English (by Howard Goldblatt and Sylvia Li-chun Lin), German (by Marc Hermann), Russian (by Natalia Vlasova), Korean (by Moon Hyun-seon), and Japanese (by Yutori Iizuka).

Massage was adapted into a 2013 TV series See Without Looking, a 2014 film Blind Massage (which won Asian Film Award for Best Film and Golden Horse Award for Best Feature Film), as well as a successful stage production.

2008 Chinese novels
Novels about blindness
Chinese novels adapted into films
Chinese novels adapted into television series
Mao Dun Literature Prize
Chinese novels adapted into plays
Novels set in China
Novels about diseases and disorders